The Denim & Rhinestones Tour was the seventh headlining tour from American country music artist Carrie Underwood, in support of her ninth studio album, Denim & Rhinestones (2022). The tour began on October 15, 2022, in Greenville, South Carolina, and concluded on March 17, 2023, in Seattle, Washington with a total of 43 dates.

Background and development
Underwood announced dates for the tour on Monday, May 16, 2022, saying in a press release, "I'm excited to bring the new music of Denim & Rhinestones to life on tour, as well as put new spins on familiar favorites. We’ve been working hard already preparing an amazing show, and I can't wait to see everyone on the road!"

The tour will include new production directed by Barry Lather. while Nick Whitehouse and Fireplay will serve as production designers. 

Country singer-songwriter Jimmie Allen was announced as opening guest for the tour. Regarding the choice of Allen, Underwood said, "He has a great voice, he's nice to be around, he's funny and easygoing. You want to like the people you're on the road with. He sings songs about Jesus in his set and so do I.  And he's very bling-y, so he's quite a good fit for 'Denim & Rhinestones.'"

From every ticket sold, a donation of one dollar will be made to the Tunnels to Towers Foundation, a nonprofit which supports veterans and their families. This continued a philanthropic practice established on previous Underwood tours. General admission ticket sales began on May 20.

The tour represented her first one since the advent of the COVID-19 pandemic in the United States, although she had performed a concert residency in Las Vegas. Ticket prices were somewhat higher than for previous Underwood tours.  While the tour was going, it was announced that Underwood would be returning to her Las Vegas residency later in 2023.

The show was physically demanding for Underwood to do; Underwood spent a month before the tour opening preparing for the shows, doing workouts and other conditioning to get into top shape for it. Unlike her some of her past tours, her young children were not traveling with her, although she was flying home for quick visits to them in between some tour stops. In addition, the itinerary was constructed with a two-month break between the two legs of the tour.

The show
Unlike Underwood's two prior tours, which were done in the round, the Denim & Rhinestones Tour featured an end stage set-up. This included three different hydraulic lifts and a couple of ramps. The staging and visual elements of the show were informed by her Vegas residency, and she said, "I’ve always enjoyed the idea of having a show versus just playing a concert.  I love having lots of production elements that make things feel unique and songs feel extra special." The show features around a dozen different costumes or costume variants, with, as one reviewer said, "each seemingly flashier and shinier than the one before". For the first time, her show used an aerial component, as a new way for her to get to the B-stage, where a half-dozen songs were performed. One of those was "Two Black Cadillacs", where Underwood accompanied herself on electric guitar.

The show overall was close to two hours in length, and contained around twenty-four songs. She had eight musicians in her band. The set list consisted of eight or nine songs from the Denim & Rhinestones album, with older material spread out over her career.  Opener Allen came out and joined her in singing and dancing for the performance of the light-hearted title song from her new album. The number "Burn" featured a prominent pyrotechnics display. Before the song "Garden", Underwood spoke to the audience about the effects of the pandemic and how she hoped it would lead to everyone being more caring towards each other and more positive in their outlooks on life. Her vocal prowess was also on display during the show, several times holding long notes while staying on pitch.

While Underwood had always flavored her country music with elements of pop and rock, the shows on this tour brought out the rock aspect even more. One aspect of that was her rendition of the Guns N' Roses hit "Welcome to the Jungle" near the show's conclusion. She had performed Guns N' Roses material on previous tours (including "Sweet Child o' Mine" and "Paradise City") and she said that she had been working her way up to "Welcome to the Jungle". Indeed, the rock feel was established even as she stepped on stage, as Motörhead's "Ace of Spades" was the final lead-in song played over the sound system. She also played a solo on drums at one point during the show, that caused one reviewer to think of Dave Grohl.

Commercial and critical reception
Of the show in Salt Lake City, the Deseret News wrote that it was "a remarkably versatile show" and that "it would be a disservice to say Underwood is solely a country artist ... Underwood's music had hints of country, gospel, pop, soul, jazz, blues and hard rock." However, the paper noted that some of the subtleties of Underwood's singing tended to be lost in the concert setting, as the volume of her vocals was uniformly loud.

Bob Gendron of the Chicago Tribune wrote that of Underwood's performance that, "despite the bounty of Southern-styled apparel and accents on display, the vocalist leaned more toward the rock spectrum at a vibrant concert at which the 39-year-old served notice that she can likely succeed at anything she wants – and make it look effortless." Gendron did say, however, that using a prerecorded video clip of Jason Aldean singing his part of the "If I Didn't Love You" duet was a "glaring misstep" that "reeked of artifice".

Covering a show in her home state of Oklahoma, Tulsa World said that "Underwood looked every bit like someone who was having fun inside" the BOK Center arena. A writer for the Taste of Country site said that Underwood's show "pushed the envelope both visually and in the live interpretation of her stalwart – and growing – catalog of hits."

A review of the first leg closing show at the Chase Center in San Francisco said that it was one and the best shows of the year and that "Underwood seemed on a mission to prove she could do just about anything and it would be tough to dispute after her two-hour performance. She sang fast songs, slow songs, played the drums, guitar, and flew over the crowd."

Set list
This set list is from the October 15, 2022, show in Greenville, South Carolina. It may not represent all dates throughout the tour.

 "Good Girl"
 "Church Bells"
 "Undo It"
 "Hate My Heart"
 "Cowboy Casanova"
 "If I Didn’t Love You"
 "Wasted"
 "She Don’t Know"
 "Blown Away"
 "Burn"
 "Cry Pretty"
 "Ghost Story"
 "Two Black Cadillacs"
 "Garden"
 "Jesus, Take the Wheel"
 "How Great Thou Art"
 "Crazy Angels"
 "Denim & Rhinestones"
 "Flat on the Floor"
 "Poor Everybody Else"
 "Last Name"
 "Something in the Water"
Encore
 "Welcome to the Jungle" (Guns N Roses cover)
"Before He Cheats"

Tour dates

References

2022 concert tours
2023 concert tours
Carrie Underwood concert tours